Judge Story refers to Joseph Story (1779–1845), an associate justice of the Supreme Court of the United States.

Judge Story may also refer to:

Richard W. Story (born 1953), judge of the United States District Court for the Northern District of Georgia
William Story (attorney) (1843–1921), judge of the United States District Court for the Western District of Arkansas